Samantha Camille Dacanay Nierras is a Filipino international footballer.

Early life
Nierras was born on July 16, 1989 in Fremont, California in the United States. She was raised in California and later moved to the Philippines in 1999.

Youth career
She was first involved in football at the age of 8, when she joined kiddie soccer tournaments sponsored by Milpitas' City Police Department.

Samantha Nierras played for the La Salle Lady Booters varsity team as a football player. She played at midfield position. Nierras was named MVP of the UAAP Season 72 when she led her team to the championships as team captain.

International career
Nierras first played at the international level at age 14 for the under-19 team. Months later she made her international debut for the senior team. She was team captain at the 2014 AFC Women's Asian Cup qualifiers and 2013 Southeast Asian Games

Career statistics

International goals
Scores and results list the Philippines' goal tally first.

Personal life
Samantha Nierras' father, Ernie Nierras, is a football coach and the current head coach of the Philippine women's national team. Her involvement in the national team prompted her father's to take the job as one of the two team manager of the team under head coach Marlon Maro. Samantha credits her family for introducing the sport of football.

References

1989 births
Living people
De La Salle University alumni
Filipino women's footballers
Philippines women's international footballers
Women's association football midfielders